Canadian National Railway (CN) Class S locomotives were a Class of 2-8-2 wheel arrangement in the Whyte notation, or 1′D1′ in UIC classification. These locomotives were designed for 16° operating curvature. The first examples of this very successful class were built for the Grand Trunk Railway in 1913. Major purchases of the class continued through 1924. Sub-classes S-3 and S-4 employed higher pressure boilers with smaller diameter cylinders to achieve similar tractive effort with higher efficiency. The class remained in freight service until the final replacement of steam with diesel-electric locomotives. 53 were renumbered between 4045 and 4097 in 1956.

Sub-classes

Preservation
Number 3239 was preserved by the Canadian Railway Historical Association. Number 3254 by W.F. Barron of Ashland, Pennsylvania. No. 3254 first operated in excursion service at the Gettysburg Railroad in Gettysburg and Mount Holly Springs from 1985 until being put into storage again in 1986, it was then sold to Steamtown National Historic Site in Scranton were it ran from 1987 to 2012 when it was taken out of service indefinitely due to severe frame issues. No. 3377 was first owned by the Edaville Railroad, but soon moved to Steamtown, and eventually became a source of spare parts for No. 3254. Number 3734 (renumbered 4070) is now owned by the Midwestern Railway Preservation Society in ex Baltimore and Ohio Railroad roundhouse in Cleveland Ohio.

Notes 

2-8-2 locomotives
Baldwin locomotives
ALCO locomotives
MLW locomotives
CLC locomotives
S
Freight locomotives
Railway locomotives introduced in 1913